Samad Mir (c. 1893 – 1959) was a mystic Sufi poet from Kashmir.

Life 
Samad Mir was born at Alam Sahib Narwara Srinagar Kashmir, to Khaliq Mir and Noor Died in 1893 or 1894. Khaliq Mir was a dervish, aboriginally from Nambalhar, a small village in Budgam but had now migrated to Srinagar to earn a living. Samad Mir was the only son to return to his native village. His younger brother Rahim Mir decided to stay at Narwara. Mohammad Mir, the third son of Khaliq Mir died in his twenties. Samad Mir worked as a laborer at Hari Nivas Palace at Srinagar (commonly known as The Grand Palace). Mir had 3 sons and a daughter.

Poetry and Sufism 
With no formal education, Samad Mir was illiterate. His poetry was written for him by Ali Shah of Wagar, Budgam. His spiritual mentors were Habib Najar of Wagar Budgam, Khaliq Najar of Batmaloo Srinagar, and Ramzan Dar of Anchidora Anantnag (Kashmir).

His poetry was compiled in his Kulyaat, called Kulyaat-e-Samad Mir by Moti Lal Saqi. Kulyaat-e-Samad Mir has been published and revised four times by Jammu and Kashmir Academy of Art, Culture and Languages. A monograph on Samad Mir has been published In Urdu and Kashmiri by Sahitya Akademi, Government of India. He has written more than 200 poems.

In line with Sufi tradition, Mir's poetry often deals with true abstract qualities such as beauty and truth. It then relates how these qualities (as aspects of God) relate to the world around him. Beyond that, a common theme is a praise of Prophets, Walis, and Sufi saints of Islam.

Death 
Samad Mir died on 9 January 1959 at his residence in Nambalhar. He is buried at Agar, Nambalhar.

Works 
 Aknandun "The Only Son"
 Praran Praran Tarawatiyay
 Islamic Poetry (Na'ats)

References 

Mystic poets
Sufi poets
1959 deaths
Year of birth uncertain